Beyond the aXis of Truth is a Singaporean Mandarin supernatural/sci-fi crime drama series which aired in June 2001. It stars Edmund Chen, Ivy Lee, Chen Liping, Chen Shucheng & Nick Shen as the casts of this series.

Synopsis
Forensic pathologist Chen Xueming (Edmund Chen) and CID officer Wu Pinyu (Ivy Lee) work together on several manslaughter cases, each of which involves unnatural phenomenons that can only be described as supernatural such as reality-bending, cryokinesis, walking dead/vampirism, time-travel and plant-human hybrids

Case 1: A woman named Liao Yongwei (Vivian Lai) having an extra-marital affair with paraplegic Li Zeyuan (Chen Tianwen) is drowned. When Zeyuan is hospitalised, Yongwei's estranged husband is mysteriously attacked at a bowling alley and later burnt at the hospital.

Case 2: Xueming and Pinyu are called to a string of bodies which showed signs of having been frozen at some point, beginning with two police officers who had been escorting a shoplifter. Nothing seems to match up and their best lead is a mentally disturbed young woman, the same woman that the officers had arrested for shoplifting.

Case 3: A vehicle accident fatality was reportedly seen walking out of the ambulance. Shortly after, several accidents and incidents connected to the "dead man" occur but the presence of blood and no matching victim proves baffling. It wasn't long before a string of corpses of criminals wanted by the police are found drained of their blood, making Xueming and Pinyu suspect they might be dealing with no ordinary criminal.

Case 4: A man discovers he can return to certain points of time, only to learn that time is not something to be messed with

Case 5: A series of incidents ultimately leads to Xueming discovering that his lover Li Yiwen (Priscelia Chan) is in fact a plant-human hybrid. This discovery would lead to tragedy as Yiwen is later found dead, having seemingly been killed in a brutal manner...

Cast
Edmund Chen as Chen Xueming
Ivy Lee as Wu Pinyu
Chen Liping as Jiang Meiqi
Ye Shipin as Li Guo'en
Nick Shen as Zhuge Fei
Chen Shucheng as Prof Michael Wu
Vivian Lai as Liao Yongwei
Chen Tianwen as Li Zeyuan
Priscelia Chan as Li Yiwen
Richard Low as Song Tianli
Huang Bingjie as Song Wenxin
Yang Libing as Song Shanni
Shawn Lee as younger Xueming
Pan Lingling as Guo Mingliang
Yao Wenlong as Dr Mike

2001 Accolades

References

External links
Opening Theme
Beyond the Axis of Truth (English)
Beyond the Axis of Truth (Chinese)

Singapore Chinese dramas
2000s Singaporean television series
2001 Singaporean television seasons